Ahmed Niyaz (born 17 March 1980) is a Maldivian footballer, who is currently playing for New Radiant SC.

References

1979 births
Living people
Maldivian footballers
Maldives international footballers
Club Valencia players
New Radiant S.C. players
Association football midfielders